"(I'll Never Be) Maria Magdalena", also known simply as "Maria Magdalena", is a song recorded by German singer Sandra for her debut studio album The Long Play (1985). The song, written by Hubert Kemmler, Markus Löhr, Michael Cretu and Richard Palmer-James, was released as the lead single from The Long Play on July 15th. 1985, by Virgin Records, and was a major chart hit in Europe, reaching number one in multiple countries. It remains Sandra's signature song.

Background and release
The song was composed by Hubert Kemmler, Markus Löhr and Michael Cretu. Cretu also arranged and produced the song. The lyrics were written by Richard Palmer-James. The allusion to the biblical figure Mary Magdalene was Kemmler's idea and came up when a name with seven syllables was needed for the chorus. Only the German version of the name would suffice, though, "Mary Magdalene" has five. Kemmler also provided co-lead vocals on this recording and a number of Sandra's subsequent songs.

The song was first released in March 1985 as the lead single from Sandra's debut album The Long Play. It was her third single as a solo artist, but the first solo single to be released internationally. Initially unsuccessful in its bid to gain radio play, the label targeted DJs in Greece and their tourist audiences next, and the song subsequently became a big hit in Greece, where it topped the singles chart. Returning tourists requested the song at home, and it eventually reached number one on the official German singles chart for four consecutive weeks between 13 September and 4 October 1985. The single then peaked at number one in Austria, Switzerland, Sweden, Norway, the Netherlands and Finland. It also reached number 1 on the airplay chart in Germany as well as the top 5 in Austria. In the pan-European charts, it was a top 10 and a top 20 hit on the airplay and sales charts, respectively. The song was also a popular radio hit song in Brazil, the Middle East, Northern Africa and Eastern Europe.

The song was re-released in a remixed version as a standalone single in 1993, but was not commercially successful, though it reached the top ten in Finland and the top twenty in Denmark. Music website AllMusic retrospectively rated it 2.5 out of 5 stars. In 1999, another remix of the song was released only in France as a promotional single in support of her compilation album My Favourites. The track was remixed again for her remix album Reflections (2006), and the original version was later sampled in the song "Kings & Queens" on her tenth album Stay in Touch (2012).

Music videos
A simple performance music video was filmed in 1985, which presents Sandra accompanied by a bassist/backing vocalist, a percussionist and a keyboardist. It was directed by Mike Leckebusch. The music video was released on Sandra's VHS video compilations Ten on One (The Singles) and 18 Greatest Hits, released in 1987 and 1992, respectively, as well as the 2003 DVD The Complete History.

The industrial style video for the 1993 version was directed by Marcus Adams, and was also released on The Complete History DVD.

Track listing and formats
7-inch vinyl single
A. "(I'll Never Be) Maria Magdalena" – 3:58
B. "Party Games" (Instrumental) – 3:25

12-inch vinyl single
A. "(I'll Never Be) Maria Magdalena" – 7:13
B. "Party Games" (instrumental) – 3:25

CD maxi-single (1993)
"Maria Magdalena" (Radio Edit) – 3:58
"Maria Magdalena" (Clubmix) – 6:01
"Maria Magdalena" (Original Version) – 3:58

12-inch vinyl single (1993)
A. "Maria Magdalena" (Clubmix) – 6:01
B. "Maria Magdalena" (Vega Sicilia Mix) – 5:36

12-inch vinyl single (1999)
A. "Maria Magdalena" (Original Version) – 3:58
B. "Maria Magdalena" (99 Remix) – 3:59

Charts

Weekly charts

Year-end charts

Certifications

Sampling 
 In 1993 the same background music in the song "(I'll Never Be) Maria Magdalena" was used for the song "Vino noći", which was performed by the Croatian singer Neno Belan, the lead vocalist of the band Đavoli.

References

External links
 "(I'll Never Be) Maria Magdalena" at Discogs
 The official Sandra YouTube channel

1985 singles
1985 songs
1993 singles
Dutch Top 40 number-one singles
Cultural depictions of Mary Magdalene
Number-one singles in Austria
Number-one singles in Finland
Number-one singles in Germany
Number-one singles in Greece
Number-one singles in Norway
Number-one singles in Sweden
Number-one singles in Switzerland
Sandra (singer) songs
Song recordings produced by Michael Cretu
Songs written by Hubert Kemmler
Songs written by Markus Löhr
Songs written by Michael Cretu
Songs written by Richard Palmer-James
Virgin Records singles